Christine Ellen Hynde (born September 7, 1951) is an American musician. She is a founding  member and the lead vocalist, guitarist, and primary songwriter of the rock band the Pretenders, and one of the band's two remaining original members alongside drummer Martin Chambers.

Hynde formed the Pretenders in Hereford, England in 1978, with Pete Farndon, James Honeyman-Scott and Chambers. She has also recorded a number of songs with other musicians including Frank Sinatra, Cher and UB40. She recorded her first solo album, Stockholm, in 2014. Hynde was inducted into the Rock and Roll Hall of Fame in 2005 as a member of the Pretenders.

Early life
Hynde was born in Akron, Ohio, the daughter of a part-time secretary and a Yellow Pages manager. She graduated from Firestone High School in Akron, but stated that "I was never too interested in high school. I mean, I never went to a dance, I never went out on a date, I never went steady. It became pretty awful for me. Except, of course, I could go see bands, and that was the kick. I used to go to Cleveland just to see any band. So I was in love a lot of the time, but mostly with guys in bands that I had never met. For me, knowing that Brian Jones was out there, and later that Iggy Pop was out there, made it kind of hard for me to get too interested in the guys that were around me. I had, uh, bigger things in mind."

Early career
Hynde became interested in hippie counterculture, Eastern mysticism, and vegetarianism. While attending Kent State University's Art School for three years, she joined Sat. Sun. Mat., a band which included Mark Mothersbaugh, later of Devo. Hynde was also caught up in the Kent State massacre on May 4, 1970, in which the boyfriend of one of her friends was among the four victims.

In May 1973, Hynde moved to London. With her art background, she landed a job in an architectural firm but left after eight months. It was then that she met rock journalist Nick Kent and landed a position at the music magazine New Musical Express (NME), writing what she subsequently described as "half-baked philosophical drivel and nonsensical tirades." This proved not to last and Hynde later got a job at Malcolm McLaren and Vivienne Westwood's clothing store, SEX. Hynde attempted to start a band in France, The Frenchies (fr), before her return to Cleveland in 1975, and joined a rhythm and blues group, Jack Rabbit.

She returned to France in 1976 to try to form a band but it did not materialize. She left Kent for Michael Fradji Memmi, bass player of the Frenchies, which she joined. For one show at the Olympia Theatre when their singer had left, she performed as lead singer. She returned to London in the midst of the early punk movement. At one point she tried to convince Steve Jones and then Johnny Rotten (of the Sex Pistols, who were managed by McLaren) to marry her to get her a work permit. Hynde's version of this episode has it that Rotten "offered to go to a registry office with me and do the unmentionable" but when he subsequently withdrew, Sid Vicious volunteered to take his place. Upon arrival at the registry office the following morning, they found it "closed for an extended holiday" and were unable to attend the following day due to Vicious making a court appearance. In late 1976, Hynde responded to an advertisement in Melody Maker for band members and attended an audition for the band that would become 999. Jon Moss (who would later be in Culture Club) and Tony James of Generation X also auditioned. Later, Hynde tried to start a group with Mick Jones from the Clash.

After the lack of success with the band, Malcolm McLaren placed her as a guitarist in Masters of the Backside but she was asked to leave the group just as it became the Damned. After a brief spell in the band Johnny Moped, Mick Jones invited Hynde to join his band on their initial tour of Britain. Hynde recollected of that period,

Hynde also spent a short time with punk band the Moors Murderers in 1978. Named after The Moors Murderers (a pair of child-killers), the band consisted of future Visage front man Steve Strange on vocals, Vince Ely on drums, with Mark Ryan (a.k.a. The Kid) and Hynde on guitar. The band's name alone was enough to start controversy, and she soon distanced herself from the group, as noted in NME. Hynde said, "I'm not in the group, I only rehearsed with them". She stated that "Steve Strange and Soo Catwoman had the idea for the group, and asked me to help them out on guitar, which I did, even though I was getting my own group together and still am".

The Pretenders

Late 1970s
In 1978, Hynde made a demo tape and gave it to Dave Hill, owner of the label Real Records. Hill stepped in to manage her career, and began by paying off the back rent owed on her rehearsal room in Covent Garden, London. Hill also advised Hynde to take her time and get a band together. In the spring of 1978, Hynde met bass guitarist Pete Farndon and they selected a band consisting of James Honeyman-Scott (guitar, vocals, keyboards), and Martin Chambers (drums, vocals, percussion). The name The Pretenders was inspired by the Sam Cooke version of the Platters' 1955 R&B hit song "The Great Pretender".

They recorded a demo tape (including "Precious", "The Wait" and a Kinks cover, "Stop Your Sobbing"), handed it to Hynde's friend Nick Lowe, produced a single ("Stop Your Sobbing"/"The Wait") and performed their first gig at a club in Paris. The single was released in January 1979 and hit No. 33 in the UK. A second single "Kid" followed to similar success in July 1979.  In November 1979, the Pretenders released their first signature single "Brass in Pocket" in the UK, which hit UK number 1 on January 19, 1980, the same date as  their eponymous first album.  Both went on to similar chart success worldwide.

Hynde is portrayed by Sydney Chandler in the 2022 Craig Pearce-Danny Boyle FX biographical drama miniseries Pistol.

1980s–1990s

The band released an EP album,  Extended Play, then Pretenders II later in the summer. "Talk of the Town" and "Message of Love" were on both. The Pretenders lineup would change repeatedly over the next decade. Honeyman-Scott died of a drug overdose on June 16, 1982, just days after Farndon had been fired from the band. Farndon also died of a drug overdose the following year. After reforming with a caretaker line-up for their next single, "Back on the Chain Gang", the band settled down with Robbie McIntosh (guitar) and Malcolm Foster (bass) during the recording of their next album, the worldwide hit Learning to Crawl.  Chambers left the band in the mid-1980s before the Get Close album was released in 1986. The album included the hits "Don't Get Me Wrong" and "My Baby". Amidst the ever-changing lineup, Hynde endured as the sole original Pretender until Chambers' return in the mid-1990s. Hynde was the only stable member of the band during this period. In 1994, the band had another hit: The ballad "I'll Stand by You".

2000s onward
Hynde continued with the Pretenders into the new century both in new recording as well as multiple tours worldwide.  New Pretenders albums emerged in 2002 (Loose Screw), 2008 (Break Up The Concrete) and 2016.

Hynde was inducted into the Rock and Roll Hall of Fame in 2005 as a member of the Pretenders. The ceremony was held at the Waldorf-Astoria Hotel in Manhattan, New York City.

In 2016, the band collaborated with Dan Auerbach of the Black Keys on the album Alone. This album was released as a Pretenders' album, though Hynde was the only original member to appear on it. The new band also played a concert for the BBC at the Maida Vale studio. In 2016, Hynde and the Pretenders opened for Stevie Nicks.

In July 2020, the Pretenders released their 11th studio album Hate for Sale. The album was well received critically and obtained a score of 78 on the critical aggregator Metacritic.

On March 9, 2022, Hynde performed a rendition of the Pretenders song "I'll Stand By You" at Night for Ukraine, a fundraising benefit held at the Roundhouse in north London, with the funds raised being donated to the Disasters Emergency Committee appeal, to provide aid to people fleeing Ukraine following the Russian invasion. The event was organized by Fabien Riggall in collaboration with the Ukrainian pop duo Bloom Twins.

Other musical projects
Hynde, along with Curved Air's Sonja Kristina, sang backing vocals on Mick Farren's 1978 album Vampires Stole My Lunch Money and also on Hurt by Chris Spedding. She also sang backing on a track, Nite Klub, on the Specials' eponymous debut album. Hynde sang a duet with INXS on their album Full Moon, Dirty Hearts in 1993. She appears on the title track of the album. Hynde sang the vocals on the track "State of Independence Part II" on a Moodswings album named Moodfood, which was played during the closing credits on the soundtrack of Single White Female. She provided backing vocals on Morrissey's single "My Love Life" in 1991 and again on b-side "Shame Is The Name" in 2009.

Hynde recorded a duet with Frank Sinatra on Sinatra's 1994 album Duets II. They performed the song "Luck Be a Lady". In 1995, Hynde made an acting appearance as fictional character Stephanie Schiffer on the US television comedy Friends on the episode "The One with the Baby on the Bus", in which she performed "Angel of the Morning" and "Smelly Cat" (which she co-wrote) with Lisa Kudrow as Phoebe Buffay on acoustic guitar. Also, in 1995, Hynde sang a cover of "Love Can Build a Bridge" with Cher and Neneh Cherry. Eric Clapton appeared on the track, supplying the lead guitar solo that is featured in the song's instrumental bridge. In 1997, the EMI publishing company issued a cease and desist request to Rush Limbaugh, who for years had been using an edited instrumental version of Hynde's song "My City Was Gone" for the broadcast's opening theme. When the request came to Hynde's attention during a radio interview, she said her parents loved and listened to Rush and she did not mind its use. They agreed to a royalty contract which she retained and at one time used for a payment to PETA to raise awareness of chemical testing on animals.

Hynde's most popular non-Pretenders collaboration with another artist, chartwise, was her 1985 collaboration with UB40 on a cover of Sonny and Cher's "I Got You Babe." The track topped the UK singles chart and went as high as No. 28 on the Billboard Hot 100 in the U.S.

On April 10, 1999, Hynde led the memorial concert "Here, There and Everywhere - A Concert for Linda" for her late close friend Linda McCartney at the Royal Albert Hall, London.  Proceeds went to animal rights charities.  The Pretenders were the backing band for all artists.

In 1999, Hynde played guitar and sang vocals with Sheryl Crow on the song "If It Makes You Happy" during a concert in Central Park. Hynde is mentioned prominently in the lyrics of the Terence Trent D'Arby song "Penelope Please". In 1998, Hynde sang a duet with her friend Emmylou Harris, "She", accompanied by the Pretenders on the Gram Parsons tribute album, Return of the Grievous Angel: A Tribute to Gram Parsons. Hynde had previously reviewed Gram and Emmylou's debut country rock classic, "GP." The version merges Emmylou's country rock and Hynde's reggae tinged new wave. Hynde also recorded a song called "Cry (If You Don't Mind)" with the Spanish band Jarabe de Palo for their album Un metro cuadrado – 1m². She supplied the voice for Siri, the clouded leopard in the movie Rugrats Go Wild (2003) in which she sang a duet with Bruce Willis.

In 2004, Hynde moved to São Paulo, Brazil, for a couple of months in order to play with Brazilian musician Moreno Veloso in an informal tour that lasted until December 2004. She bought a flat in the Copan Building in São Paulo city. She was also the vocalist on Tube & Berger's 2004 No. 1 Hot Dance Airplay track "Straight Ahead". The track gave Hynde a No. 1 track on the Billboard charts. Likewise in 2005, Hynde duetted with Ringo Starr on a song entitled "Don't Hang Up" which can be heard on Starr's album Choose Love. Also in 2005, she collaborated with Incubus on a song called "Neither Of Us Can See". The song is on the soundtrack album for Stealth.

On October 17, 2008, she was an opening act for fellow Akron-area musicians Devo at a special benefit concert at the Akron Civic Theater for then-presidential candidate Barack Obama. The Black Keys, another Akron-based band, and the then up-and-coming solo artist, Rachel Roberts, performed prior to her.

Hynde features as guest vocalist on Ray Davies' 2009 Christmas single Postcard From London and Morrissey's Years of Refusal the same year.

Hynde and Welsh singer J.P. Jones formed a band called "J.P., Chrissie and the Fairground Boys", releasing an album, Fidelity, on August 24, 2010. Several stops on the tour were recorded and sold on USB flash drives.

On February 5, 2011, Hynde and the Pretenders performed live on CMT Crossroads with Faith Hill and her band, including songs from both catalogs.

Along with John Cale and Nick Cave, Hynde played on BBC Four for the Songwriter's Circle program on July 9, 1999. The concert took place at the Subterania Club in London, England and was released on DVD. She also later joined Cave in 2010 for a rendition of Screamin' Jay Hawkins' famous song "I Put a Spell on You" as a benefit for the Haiti disasters. The song and music video featured performances by Mick Jones, Glen Matlock, Shane MacGowan, and Bobby Gillespie among others.

Hynde released a new album, "Stockholm", on June 10, 2014. The album featured contributions from Neil Young and John McEnroe.

Hynde released Valve Bone Woe, a jazz/pop album of selected covers with the Valve Bone Woe ensemble on September 6, 2019, produced by Marius de Vries. The album debuted at No.32 on the Official UK album charts and at No. 1 on the UK Jazz and Blues chart.

Artistry and influence
Hynde has a contralto vocal range. Until 1978, shortly before the advent of the Pretenders, Hynde had little idea what she sounded like.  Hynde eschews formal voice training; she contends that "distinctive voices in rock are trained through years of many things: frustration, fear, loneliness, anger, insecurity, arrogance, narcissism, or just sheer perseverance – anything but a teacher."

In a 1994 interview, Madonna recalled of Hynde:
"I saw her play in Central Park [in August 1980, performing with the Pretenders]. She was amazing: the only woman I'd seen in performance where I thought, yeah, she's got balls, she's awesome! ... It gave me courage, inspiration, to see a woman with that kind of confidence in a man's world."

Personal life
Circa 1973, Hynde, unable to obtain a work visa, asked both Sid Vicious and Johnny Rotten to marry her. Hynde then went back to USA briefly, before returning to the UK. 

In 1982, Hynde and Ray Davies planned to wed in Guildford, but "the guy in the registry office took one look at us and suggested we come back another time". In 1983, Hynde had a daughter, Natalie, with Davies. 
She married Jim Kerr, lead singer of the band Simple Minds, in 1984. Together they had a daughter, Yasmin, in 1985. They lived in South Queensferry, Scotland and divorced in 1990; Hynde was married to a Colombian artist and sculptor, Lucho Brieva from 1997 to 2002. Lucho Brieva was married to Gina Bellman, from 2005 to 2007.

She follows Vaishnavism, a branch of Hinduism, and travels to India once every year to further her studies.

Hynde lives in London, and also has an apartment in the Northside Lofts in her hometown of Akron.

Hynde has described becoming a vegetarian as "the best thing that ever happened to me". She says that she came to regard meat-eaters with "distaste, almost contempt" but has learned to "live and associate with [them] but never respected them". Hynde is also an animal rights activist and a supporter of PETA and the animal rights group Viva!. She also appeared in anti-fur trade organization Respect for Animals' commercial 'Fur and Against' in 2002, alongside Jude Law, Paul McCartney and others.

Hynde has publicly campaigned against the extradition of Julian Assange to the United States, and in February 2020 called on then President Donald Trump to "set him free".

Autobiography
Hynde published an autobiography, Reckless: My Life as a Pretender, on September 8, 2015.

In October 2018, Hynde released a limited edition book of her artworks, titled Adding The Blue, the name being taken from the final track on her 2014 solo album, Stockholm.

Restaurant venture

Hynde opened the VegiTerranean, a vegan restaurant, in the Northside Lofts, Akron, Ohio in November 2007. The restaurant served fusion Italian–Mediterranean food by head chef James Scot Jones. Before the restaurant's opening on September 15, 2007, Hynde performed three songs at the restaurant with Adam Seymour, a former lead guitarist of the Pretenders. The restaurant was voted among the top five vegan restaurants in the U.S. It closed on October 2, 2011, owing to the economic climate, according to Hynde.

Discography

JP, Chrissie and the Fairground Boys
Fidelity! (2010)

Solo albums

Singles

See also
 List of animal rights advocates

Notes

References

External links

 Pretenders Archives
 Pretenders 977 Radio
 
 Hynde: BBC News article
 Hynde: Associated Press News article
 Chrissie Hynde: I'm Just Telling My Story – new memoir, Reckless: My Life as a Pretender (NPR ME 10/6/15)

1951 births
Living people
The Pretenders members
American contraltos
American dance musicians
American women rock singers
American rock guitarists
American rock songwriters
Women new wave singers
Feminist musicians
Rhythm guitarists
American women restaurateurs
American restaurateurs
Kent State University alumni
American Hindus
American expatriates in Brazil
American expatriates in France
American expatriates in England
Musicians from Akron, Ohio
Guitarists from Ohio
Singer-songwriters from Ohio
20th-century American women guitarists
20th-century American guitarists
21st-century American women guitarists
21st-century American guitarists
20th-century American women singers
American autobiographers
21st-century American women singers
American women non-fiction writers
20th-century American singers
21st-century American singers
Women punk rock singers